Oh Olsun is a 1973 Turkish comedy film directed by Ertem Eğilmez.

Cast 
 Tarık Akan - Ferit Haznedar
 Hale Soygazi - Alev
 Hulusi Kentmen - Fehmi Haznedar, Ferit's Father
 Kemal Sunal - Fazil
 Metin Akpınar - Doktor Metin
 Halit Akçatepe - Ferdi
 Münir Özkul - Burhan Usta, Alev's Father
 Adile Naşit - Ferit's Mother

References

External links 

1973 romantic comedy films
Films set in Istanbul
Turkish romantic comedy films
1970s pregnancy films
1973 films
Turkish pregnancy films